Mon Repos is a coastal locality in the Bundaberg Region, Queensland, Australia. In the  Mon Repos had a population of 30 people.

Geography 

Mon Repos Beach is a long sandy beach along most of the coastline at Mon Repos.

Most of the coastline is within the Mon Repos Conservation Park, established to protect the nesting areas of turtles. The north of the locality is still used for agriculture, a mixture of grazing and crop growing. The south of the locality is reserved for environmental purposes. There are some small pockets of housing and a caravan park on the coast 

The Barolin Nature Reserve is inland of the conservation park. It is filled with grassy plains and wetlands and has a sizeable population of birds. Earlier known as Pasturage Reserve, it was primarily used for cattle grazing. However, grazing has been reduced significantly to save the forest.

History 
Mon Repos is French for "My Rest" and was the name of the homestead built in 1884 by Augustus Purling Barton, a Queensland sugar industry pioneer. Barton also built the Mon Repos sugar-mill in 1884, as a crushing plant, which was converted into a manufacturing plant in 1888. State Library of Queensland hold the Barton Family records which includes information about the Mon Repos homestead and the running of the Barton's sugar mills and plantations.   

In the 1890s, the governments of France, Queensland and New South Wales decided to construct an undersea telegraph cable to link Australia to North America across the Pacific Ocean via New Caledonia, Fiji, Samoa, and Hawaii. The cable came ashore at Mon Repos, where a cable station was constructed. The cable was used until the 1920s when it was replaced by a radio service via Sydney and the cable station demolished. Two lieutenants Bruce Enzer and Bruce Carey died during the training. Some remains of the cable station can be seen within the caravan park.

Sandhills Provisional School opened on 20 March 1893. On 1 January 1909 it became Sandhills State School. In January 1921 it was renamed Bargara State School.

In the  Mon Repos had a population of 30 people.

Heritage listings 

Mon Repos has a number of heritage-listed sites, including Grange Road: South Sea Islander Wall

Around 1884 Augustus Barton, owner of the Mon Repos homestead used South Sea Islander indentured labour on his properties, which before being planted with cane had to be cleared of scoria stones, remnants of a volcanic formation located nearby. These stones were then used to construct the South Sea Islander Walls which remain substantially intact and are now heritage listed, a reminder of the people who were brought to work as slaves on Queensland farms between 1863 and 1904.

Education
Despite the name, Bargara State School is a government primary (Prep-6) school for boys and girls at 591 Bargara Road in Mon Repos. In 2018, the school had an enrolment of 448 students with 31 teachers (26 full-time equivalent) and 22 non-teaching staff (13 full-time equivalent).

There are no secondary schools in Mon Repos. The nearest secondary school is Kepnock State High School in Kepnock in Bundaberg to the south-west.

Facilities 
Despite the name, Bargara SES Facility is at 18 Potters Road in Mon Repos.

Conservation Centre 
The Mon Repos Turtle Centre, designed by KIRK architect (Richard Kirk Architect), was built in 2019 for Queensland Parks & Wildlife to facilitate research and education surrounding turtle conservation.

References

External links

 Mon Repos Plantation John Oxley Library Blog, State Library of Queensland. 

Bundaberg Region
Coastline of Queensland
Localities in Queensland